Talbert Tanunurwa Shumba (born 12 May 1990) is a Zimbabwean footballer who plays as a goalkeeper for Chapungu United F.C. and the Zimbabwe national football team.

Career

International
Shumba was included in Zimbabwe's squad for both the 2017 and 2018 COSAFA Cup tournaments, but did not feature in any of their matches either year. He was included in Zimbabwe's squad for the 2019 COSAFA Cup as well. Shumba made his senior international debut on 7 June 2019, coming on as a 64th minute substitute for Elvis Chipezeze in a 2–2 draw with Lesotho at the 2019 COSAFA Cup. Zimbabwe won the match 5–4 on penalties, with Shumba denying Tshwarelo Bereng from the spot.

References

External links

1990 births
Living people
Dynamos F.C. players
Zimbabwe Premier Soccer League players
Zimbabwean footballers
Zimbabwe international footballers
Association football goalkeepers
2021 Africa Cup of Nations players